Rural Fire Service can mean any of the following:

In Australia:
 Australian Capital Territory Rural Fire Service
 New South Wales Rural Fire Service
 The Rural Fire Service Queensland is a part of the Queensland Fire and Emergency Services